Changcheng District is one of the three districts comprising the city of Jiayuguan, Gansu province, China.

References 

County-level divisions of Gansu
Jiayuguan City